Jonas Fager (born June 2, 1969) is a Swedish sprint canoer who competed from the early 1990s to the early 2000s (decade). He won a bronze medal in the K-4 10000 m event at the 1991 ICF Canoe Sprint World Championships in Paris.

Fager also competed in three Summer Olympics, earning his best finish of sixth in the K-4 1000 m event at Atlanta in 1996.

References

Sports-reference.com profile

1969 births
Canoeists at the 1992 Summer Olympics
Canoeists at the 1996 Summer Olympics
Canoeists at the 2000 Summer Olympics
Living people
Olympic canoeists of Sweden
Swedish male canoeists
ICF Canoe Sprint World Championships medalists in kayak